Platygyriella frahmii is a species of moss from the genus Platygyriella. It was first described as Pylaisiella frahmii by W.R. Buck in 1993 and transferred to Platygyriella by T. Arikawa in 2004. It is found in Africa at an elevation of 2100 meters.

References

Hypnaceae
Plants described in 1993
Taxa named by William Russel Buck
Flora of Africa